Walter Cesar Nogueira da Silva (12 January 1942 – 21 May 2009) was a Brazilian professional footballer who played as a striker. Active primarily in South Africa – scoring a total of 162 goals for Highlands Park, Powerlines, Hellenic and Berea Park – Da Silva was also a football manager, and had coached Orlando Pirates, Kaizer Chiefs and Moroka Swallows.

In November 1999, while managing Moroka Swallows, two supporters decided to kidnap da Silva and escaped with him, forcing the Brazilian to make a phone call to his assistants ahead of a game against Bush Bucks, asking them to leave the stadium.

References

1942 births
2009 deaths
Brazilian footballers
Highlands Park F.C. players
Berea Park F.C. players
Brazilian football managers
Brazilian expatriates in South Africa
Orlando Pirates F.C. managers
Kaizer Chiefs F.C. managers
Moroka Swallows F.C. managers
Kidnappings in South Africa
Kidnapped Brazilian people
Association football forwards
National Football League (South Africa) players